Marco Ferraro (1955 in Rouyn-Noranda, Quebec – August 31, 2017 in Montreal) was a Canadian curler, broadcaster and inventor from Boucherville, Quebec.

Ferraro grew up in Maple Grove, Quebec where he learned how to curl. After graduating from McGill University, he would later join the Lachine based Lawren Steventon rink, throwing second stones. The team won the 1988 Quebec men's curling championship, earning them the right to represent the province at the 1988 Labatt Brier, Canada's national men's curling championship on home ice in Chicoutimi, Quebec. At the Brier, the team would finish with a 4-7 record, missing the playoffs. As it happened, Ferraro was the only French speaking curler in the tournament, and was invited by RDS to commentate games in that language. He worked for that network until 2009.

Also during the 1980s, Ferraro invented the "Marco Hack", which would become the official hack used in curling matches beginning in 1989. His first name "Marco" appears on these hacks which are a mainstay in the modern curling rink, appearing in about 95% of curling clubs around the world.

From 2009 to 2015 Ferraro worked as Marketing Director and then as General Manager of Curling Quebec.  Ferraro played lead for Quebec at the 2010 Canadian Senior Curling Championships, on a team skipped by Pierre Charette. The team would finish with a 6-5 record, missing the playoffs.

After an eight-month battle with brain cancer, Ferraro died in August 2017 at the Notre-Dame Hospital.

References
Curling Canada obituary

1955 births
2017 deaths
Curlers from Quebec
Canadian male curlers
Sportspeople from Rouyn-Noranda
People from Boucherville
Curling broadcasters
Canadian inventors
Deaths from cancer in Quebec
McGill University alumni